Byron Stroud (born February 12, 1969) is a Canadian bassist. He is the former bassist for metal bands Fear Factory, Imonolith and Strapping Young Lad, current bassist for metal bands City of Fire and Zimmers Hole, and studio bassist for 3 Inches of Blood.

Biography
Stroud has been involved in the Vancouver heavy music scene since the 1980s. His first serious band was Caustic Thought, who were formed in 1987, when he was only eighteen years old. The band also featured Jed Simon and Devin Townsend. Following Caustic Thought, he made his way to Front Line Assembly, joining them on the Hard Wired tour as a drum tech. Then he enrolled himself in the lineup for Strapping Young Lad.

Although he was a staple member of Strapping Young Lad at the time, he joined Fear Factory as a full-time member in 2004. He made his Fear Factory debut on their 2004 album Archetype (note: Stroud did not play on the album as all bass tracks were recorded by guitarist Christian Olde Wolbers). Stroud insisted his allegiance remained with both bands, as well as with Zimmers Hole, a somewhat comedic band he plays in with fellow Strapping Young Lad musician Jed Simon amongst others. Strapping Young Lad disbanded in 2007, allowing him to concentrate more on Fear Factory until his departure in 2012. Throughout his time in Fear Factory, he did not record on any of their albums, possibly due to either contractual reasons or other commitments.

Stroud was also part of Unit:187 along with John Morgan. He is a co-founding member of Zimmers Hole and he also featured on Devin Townsend's punk parody project Punky Brüster.

Stroud is also involved with Jed Simon's Tenet project.

In early 2011, 3 Inches of Blood asked Stroud to become their new manager. In January 2012, he joined them as their new bassist.
In February 2012, Stroud left Fear Factory and was replaced by former Chimaira rhythm guitarist Matt DeVries.

Bands

Previous bands
Caustic Thought
Front Line Assembly (Drum Tech – Hard Wired tour)
Punky Brüster
Unit:187
Devin Townsend (Physicist project)
Strapping Young Lad
Fear Factory

Current bands
City of Fire
Zimmers Hole
Ani Kyd
Tenet
Imonolith

Discography
 1994: Caustic Thought – Caustic Thought
 1996: Punky Brüster – Cooked on Phonics
 2000: Devin Townsend – Physicist
 2005: Ani Kyd – Evil Needs Candy Too

Fear Factory
Archetype (2004) (Stroud is listed as a band member although Christian Olde Wolbers recorded the bass tracks.)
Transgression (2005) (Listed as a band member but did not record due to Christian handling guitar and bass on the record.)
Mechanize (2010)

Strapping Young Lad
City (1997)
No Sleep Till Bedtime (1998)
Strapping Young Lad (2003)
Alien (2005)
The New Black (2006)

Unit 187
Unit 187 (1995)
Loaded (1998)

Zimmers Hole
Bound By Fire (1997)
Legion of Flames (2001)
When You Were Shouting at the Devil...We Were in League With Satan (2008)

Guest appearances
 Terror Syndrome (Terror Syndrome, 2008)

Equipment
Fender Custom Shop 5 String Basses, Fender Heartfield 5 String Bass, Fernandes Tremour Basses, ESP Horizon 5 String Basses, Fender Strings, DR Strings, EMG pick ups, Bill Laurence pick ups, Ampeg 1968 SVT, Ampeg SVT 2pro, Ampeg SVT 4pro, Ampeg BSP pre amp, Mesa/Boogie M-Pulse 600, Ampeg 8x10 classic speaker cabinets, Mesa/Boogie 8x10 speaker cabinets, Tech 21 Sans Amp-Bass Driver DI, Line 6 Bass Pod Pro, DigiTech effects pedals

Byron has recently signed a deal with Ashdown Amps for equipment of the ABM range.

References

External links

1969 births
Alternative metal bass guitarists
Canadian heavy metal bass guitarists
Canadian industrial musicians
Death metal musicians
Living people
Musicians from British Columbia
People from New Westminster
20th-century Canadian bass guitarists
21st-century Canadian bass guitarists
20th-century Canadian male singers
21st-century Canadian male singers
Fear Factory members
Strapping Young Lad members
3 Inches of Blood members
Industrial metal musicians